Silver Valley is a rural locality in the Tablelands Region, Queensland, Australia. In the  Silver Valley had a population of 144 people.

It is known for its mining in the late 1800s and early 1900s.

Geography 
The Wild River forms the western boundary of the locality. The Kennedy Highway passes from west to east through the southern edge of the locality. The locality is mountainous, rising from an elevation of 650m in Bulldog Gully in the south of the locality through to numerous unnamed peaks of up to 1050m. The land is relatively undeveloped apart from some areas now laid bare as the result of mining.

History 
James Venture Mulligan is credited with the first discovery of silver at Silver Valley in 1880. By 1883, outcrops of silver, lead and galena had been found in the area and it was named Silver Valley and mining commenced. It was also known as Newellton after a pioneer family. However, while the silver mines were initially productive (one yielding up to 150 ounces of metal per ton), after a few years the silver lode was exhausted and the mines abandoned. However, in 1895, three prospector George Harrod discovered two rich lodes of tin and, with Hammond and White, established the Lancelot mine and, with Hammond, White and Daniels, established the Hadleigh Castle mine. In 1899 a German company (the German Lancelot Tin Mining Company) purchased the Lancelot Mine and proposed naming the area Lancelot after the mine and later proposed to establish a new town called New Frankfurt (although there is no evidence that this occurred). However, the German company did build a dam and a 5-head battery. However, by 1910 the lodes were exhausted and diamond drills were used to search for new lodes, but without success. In 1911 the mines were sold to John Moffat. However, the popular story is that the Germans operated the mine up until the start of World War I whereupon they suddenly disappeared overnight, but this story reflects the anti-German sentiment in response to World War I rather than actual events.

Despite the apparent cessation of mining in the area, Silver Valley was described in 1912 as being "rich in minerals" with "beautiful scenery, fishing and shooting". The Silver Valley Hotel (licensee James Ramsay) could provide accommodation for 20 people for 6/- per day or 30/- per week.

Like most old mines, there were occasional flurries of renewed activity whenever there were prospects of poorer ore lodes being profitably mined, usually in response to rising metal prices or more efficient extraction technologies, but generally such mining is short-lived as it is extremely price-sensitive.

Coolgarra Provisional School opened on 29 April 1901 and closed on 1934. On 1 January 1909 it became Coolgarra State School. In July 1916 it became a half time provisional school in conjunction with Lower Nettles Provisional School (meaning a single teacher shared between two schools). However Lower Nettles closed later in 1916 and Coolgarra was again a full -time state school. Coolgarra State School closed in 1934.

Lancelot Provisional School opened in 1905 but closed in 1906 when insufficient students enrolled. It reopened circa 1920 and closed in 1926.

In the  Silver Valley had a population of 144 people.

Heritage listings 
Silver Valley has a number of heritage-listed sites, including:
 Coolgarra Station: Coolgarra Battery

References

Further reading

External links 

Tablelands Region
Localities in Queensland